František Pechar is a former figure skater who competed internationally for Czechoslovakia. He placed tenth at the 1974 European Championships and won two silver medals at the Prague Skate. Pechar later coached the 1992 Olympic bronze medalist Petr Barna and Lenka Kulovaná. He also commentated for Eurosport.

Competitive highlights

References 

Czech figure skating coaches
Czechoslovak male single skaters
Living people
Year of birth missing (living people)